Heiste is a village in Hiiumaa Parish, Hiiu County in northwestern Estonia.

The village is first mentioned in 1798 (Heiste). Historically, the village was part of Kõrgessaare Manor.

References
 

Villages in Hiiu County